Cottoidei is a suborder of ray-finned fishes which, according to the 5th edition of Fishes of the World, is placed within the order Scorpaeniformes, alongside the scorpionfishes, flatheads, eelpouts, sticklebacks and related fishes.

Taxonomy
Cottoidei was first proposed as a taxonomic grouping in 1835 by the Swiss-American zoologist Louis Agassiz. The 5th edition of Fishes of the World classifies the Cottoidei as a suborder of the order Scorpaeniformes. Other workers monkeys have found that if the Scorpaeniformes, as delimited in Fishes of the World, is not included in the Perciformes it renders the Perciformes paraphyletic. These workers retain the Cottoidei as a suborder within the Perciformes but include the zoarcoids and Sticklebacks and allies as the infraorders Zoarcales and Gasterosteales while reclassifying most the superfamilies of Fishes of the World as infraorders.

Subdivisions
The Cottoidei is divided into the following superfamilies and families:

 Superfamily Anoplopomatoidea Quast, 1965
 Family Anoplopomatidae Jordan & Gilbert, 1883 (Sablefishes)
 Superfamily Zaniolepidoidea  Shinohara, 1994
 Family Zaniolepididae Jordan & Gilbert, 1883 (Combfishes)
 Superfamily Hexagrammoidea Shinohara, 1994 
 Family Hexagrammidae Jordan, 1888 (Greenlings)
 Superfamily Trichodontoidea Nazarkin & Voskoboinikova, 2000
 Family Trichodontidae Bleeker, 1859 (Sandfishes)
 Superfamily Cottoidea Gill, 1889
 Family Jordaniidae Jordan & Evermann, 1898 (Longfin sculpins)
 Family Rhamphocottidae Jordan & Gilbert, 1883 (Grunt sculpins)
 Family Scorpaenichthyidae Jordan & Evermann, 1898
 Family Agonidae Swainson, 1839 (Poachers and sea ravens)
 Family Cottidae Bonaparte, 1831 (Sculpins)
 Family Psychrolutidae Günther, 1861 (Bighead sculpins)
 Family Bathylutichthyidae Balushkin & Voskoboinikova, 1990 (Antarctic sculpins)
 Superfamily Cyclopteroidea Gill, 1873
 Family Cyclopteridae Bonaparte, 1831 (lumpfishes or lumpsuckers)
 Family Liparidae Gill, 1861 (Snailfishes)

References

Scorpaeniformes
 
Taxa named by Louis Agassiz
Fish suborders